Qana massacre may refer to:
Qana massacre a 1996 Israeli operation that resulted in the deaths of 106 Lebanese civilians
2006 Qana airstrike a 2006 Israeli airstrike that resulted in the deaths of 28 civilians, including 16 children